The Rapa Nui (Rapa Nui: ,) are the Polynesian peoples indigenous to Easter Island. The easternmost Polynesian culture, the descendants of the original people of Easter Island make up about 60% of the current Easter Island population and have a significant portion of their population residing in mainland Chile. They speak both the traditional Rapa Nui language and the primary language of Chile, Spanish. At the 2017 census there were 7,750 island inhabitants—almost all living in the village of Hanga Roa on the sheltered west coast.

As of 2011, Rapa Nui's main source of income derived from tourism, which focuses on the giant sculptures called moai.

Over the past decade, Rapa Nui activists have been fighting for self-determination and sovereignty over their lands. Protests in 2010 and 2011 by the indigenous Rapa Nui on Easter Island, objecting to the creation of a marine park and reserve, have led to clashes with Chilean police.

History

Pre-European contact (300–1722 CE)
Rapa Nui are believed to have settled Easter Island between 300 and 1200 CE. Previously, the date of arrival was estimated to be around 700–800 CE, but more-recent evidence from radiocarbon dating supports an arrival date as late as 1200 CE. The Rapa Nui People have been found to be of Polynesian origin through genetic analysis of mitochondrial DNA of pre-historic skeletons. Genetic analysis performed by Erik Thorsby and other geneticists in 2007 revealed genetic markers of European and Amerindian origin that suggest that the Rapa Nui had European and Amerindian contributions to their DNA during or before the early 1800s.

Early European contact (1722–1870 CE)
Jacob Roggeveen was the first European to record contact with the Rapa Nui. Roggeveen allegedly set sail either in search of Juan Fernández Islands or David's Island but instead arrived at Easter Island on April 5, 1722 (Easter Sunday). He remained on the island for about a week. Felipe González de Ahedo visited the Rapa Nui in 1770 and claimed the island for Spain on a document which the islanders wrote on in rongorongo, the now undecipherable Rapa Nui script. James Cook and Jean-François de Galaup, comte de Lapérouse, visited the island for a few days in 1774 and 1786, respectively.

Culture

Language 

The Rapa Nui currently speak Spanish and the traditional Rapa Nui language. The Rapa Nui language, also known as Pascuan, is classified as an Eastern Polynesian language and is currently written in the Latin script. Rapa Nui is a minority language, as most Rapa Nui people speak Spanish as their first language. Spanish is the most widely spoken language on Easter Island and the primary language of education and administration. It is believed that Rapa Nui is currently undergoing a shift toward more Spanish sentence structure. Rongorongo, a system of glyphs discovered in the 1800s, is believed to represent an older version of the Rapa Nui language. However, the decipherment of rongorongo is an ongoing process and it is not yet clear whether Rongorongo is a form of writing or some other form of cultural expression.

Mythology 

The main stories of Rapa Nui mythology are that of Hotu Matu'a, believed to be the first settler of Easter Island, and the Tangata manu. The Tangata manu is the mythology of the Birdman religion and cult which had creator god Makemake and competition with eggs to choose the birdman who would remain sacred for five months. More recent Rapa Nui mythology includes the story of the epic battle between the Hanau Epe and the Hanau Momoko.

The trans-Neptunian dwarf planet Makemake is named after this creator deity.

Moai

The best-known aspect of the Rapa Nui culture is the moai, the 887 human figures carved from rock between 1250 and 1500 CE and transported throughout Easter Island. The moai were believed to be the living faces of ancestors and had all been toppled by 1868. The moai rest on large stone platforms called ahu, the most famous of which are Ahu Tongariki, the largest ahu, and Ahu Vinapu. Some moai have hats of red volcanic stone known as Pukao. Currently, the Rapa Nui and the Chilean government are focused on preserving and restoring the statues, including denoting an area that includes many of the statues, Rapa Nui National Park, as a World Heritage site.

Art
The Rapa Nui have historically made feather headdresses, bark cloth, wood carvings, and stone carvings. Adzes, blunt round stones, were used to complete stone images and wood carvings. A distinguishing characteristic of Rapa Nui statues is the use of shell or coral inlaid with obsidian to represent eyes.

Music

Rapa Nui traditional music consists of choral singing and chanting accompanied by instruments including conch shell trumpets, percussive dancers, accordions, and kauaha, a percussion instrument created from the jaw bone of a horse. Modern Rapanui music has had Latin American influences creating new genres such as the Rapa Nui style of tango. Matato'a, one of the most famous musical groups on the island, promotes traditional styles of dance and music.

Tattoos 

Like in other Polynesian islands, tattoos and body paintings had a fundamentally spiritual connotation. In some cases the tattoos were considered a receptor for divine strength or mana. They were manifestations of the Rapa Nui culture. Priests, warriors and chiefs had more tattoos than the rest of the population, as a symbol of their hierarchy. Both men and women were tattooed to represent their social class. Tattoos, as well as other forms of art in Rapa Nui, blends anthropomorphic and zoomorphic imagery.  Nowadays, young people are bringing back Rapa Nui tattoos as an important part of their culture and local artists base their creations on traditional motifs.

The tattooing process was performed with bone needles and combs called Uhi made out of bird or fish bones. The ink was made out of natural products, primarily from the burning of Ti leaves (Cordyline terminalis) and sugar cane.

Cuisine

Interaction with the environment

A common hypothesis is held that the apparent decline of Rapa Nui culture and society before European arrival in 1722 was caused by the over-exploitation of the island's environment, most notably through deforestation of almost all the island's trees. The most prominent proponent of this explanation is Jared Diamond who proposes a scenario for the "ecocide" on Easter Island in his 2005 book Collapse.

This idea that Rapa Nui society collapsed came out of the imbalance between general resources present on the island, mainly population, timber and food sources, and the energy- and resource-intensive feat of transporting and raising the moai. Food resources may have been scarcer than in other areas of Polynesia because of factors like the cooler climate, lack of rainfall in comparison to other islands in the area, high winds and a lack of biodiversity, leading to common Polynesian crops not faring as well as they would in other areas of the Pacific. A source of good timber is also currently noticeably absent from the island, the tallest extant plant life averaging around 7 feet.

Although Easter Island currently has only 48 different kinds of plants as evidenced by botanical surveys of the island, it once possessed many more, shown through pollen analysis conducted on sediment layers from swamps or ponds. From these samples, 22 no longer present on the island were shown to have existed at some time there. These plants included a giant palm, the Rapa Nui Palm, that showed signs of being the largest palm species in the world, eclipsing the size of the Chilean Wine Palm if it were not extinct. There are also signs of Easter Island's once possessing a far more diverse collection of fauna. The skeletal remains of 25 different species of nesting bird have been located on the island, but have since been reduced to 16.  This trend of extinction and extirpation is a common occurrence when humans populate a new area, because of tendencies to overhunt and overexploit resources.

Deforestation would have caused a decrease in crop yields due to soil erosion, loss of wood as a resource to construct fishing boats, among other things, and would have necessitated a halt to the construction of the moai erected around the island. Diamond hypothesizes that resource scarcity may have led to brutal civil war, creating a drop in population. He further hypothesizes that there were about 7,000 individuals pre-war, a number which fell to the 2,000 whom missionaries met when they showed up in the 19th century and conducted the first census of the island.

In recent years this decline has been increasingly implicated upon the arrival of Europeans to the island and the diseases that commonly came with them like smallpox, with several researchers having instead noted that pre-colonial Rapa Nui society was rather stable.

Agriculture

Agriculture on Easter Island shows signs of intensification before European arrival, necessary because of its climate which had an excess of wind and a low amount of rainfall for the area. Archaeological finds show a multitude of composting pits and irrigation systems. Large boulders were also stacked to serve as barriers against the wind. In the fields, a system of agriculture called lithic mulch was employed. In this method, farmers would lay rocks out in patterns in their fields, forcing the plants to grow in certain areas. This method is known to increase soil moisture while decreasing soil erosion from wind, effectively combating the climate conditions.

Crops grown on Easter Island included sweet potatoes, yams, taro, bananas and sugarcane. Chickens were the sole domestic animal, though the "chicken coops" carved of stone which still dot the fields of the island were most likely tombs from which the chickens obtained calcium and phosphorus in the form of bone meal.

See also
 Rapa Nui (film)
 Hotu Matu'a
 History of Easter Island
 Indigenous peoples in Chile

References

 "Easter Island". Encyclopædia Britannica. 2007. Encyclopædia Britannica Online. 21 May 2007.

External links

Rapanui: The Edmunds and Bryan Photograph Collection – documenting Rapa Nui's archaeological wonders and everyday life during the early 1900s
 – Includes interviews with Rapa Nui people.

 

Easter Island
Ethnic groups in Chile
Indigenous peoples in Chile
Indigenous peoples of Polynesia